Sylvie Léonard (born July 17, 1955) is a French-Canadian actress. She has acted in theater, film and television for over 40 years. Her most notable roles include Mimi Jarry in Rue des Pignons, Annick Jacquemin in Terre Humaine, Julie Galarneau in L'Héritage, Sylvie in Un gars, une fille and most recently Madeleine in Lâcher prise.

Awards
 Prix Gémeaux 1989 – Best actress in a drama series for 
 Prix Gémeaux 1998, 1999, 2000 and 2002 – Best actress in a comedy series for Un gars, une fille
 Prix Gémeaux 1999 – Best co-author in a comedy series for Un gars, une fille
 Prix Gémeaux 2008 – Best actress in a drama series for 
 Prix Gémeaux 2012 – Best supporting role in a drama series for

References

External links
 

Canadian television actresses
Canadian film actresses
1955 births
Living people